The Royal Lyceum Theatre is a 658-seat theatre in the city of Edinburgh, Scotland, named after the Theatre Royal Lyceum and English Opera House, the residence at the time of legendary Shakespearean actor Henry Irving. It was built in 1883 by architect C. J. Phipps at a cost of £17,000 on behalf of James B. Howard and Fred. W. P. Wyndham, two theatrical managers and performers whose partnership became the renowned Howard & Wyndham Ltd created in 1895 by Michael Simons of Glasgow.  

With only four minor refurbishments, in 1929, 1977, 1991, and 1996, the Royal Lyceum remains one of the most original and unaltered of the architect's works.

Opening night was 10 September 1883 with a performance of Much Ado About Nothing by the company of the London Lyceum Theatre, and starring Henry Irving and Ellen Terry.

In 1965, the building was purchased by the Edinburgh Corporation  from Meyer Oppenheim to house the newly formed Royal Lyceum Theatre Company, who are now the permanent residents, leasing it from the City of Edinburgh Council.

The Royal Lyceum has been one of the principal venues for the Edinburgh International Festival since the festival's inception in 1947, its owners renting out the building for three weeks every August for visiting companies, and often for a further week to Fringe companies.

The Royal Lyceum has primarily been known for its provision of drama. It has also presented some significant opera, from the first tours of Carl Rosa in the latter part of the 19th century, through to the early decades of Scottish Opera in the 1960s and 1970s. Some important operas received their first Scottish performance at the Lyceum, including Madam Butterfly, Manon and Die Meistersinger.

The theatre was the first in Britain to be fitted with an iron safety curtain, and the first in Scotland to use electricity for house lighting.

David Greig took over from Mark Thomson as artistic director in 2016.

Ghosts

The theatre is believed to be haunted, and there have been sightings of a blue lady who is believed to be Ellen Terry, the actress who performed at the Lyceum's first show. In addition, a shadowy figure has been reportedly seen high above the stage in the lighting rig. Many sightings have been reported to have been accompanied by a ringing noise.

See also
Adjoining buildings
 Traverse Theatre
 Usher Hall

References

External links

 Official website
 Royal Lyceum Theatre on Arthur Lloyd website
 A digitised collection of 63 Royal Lyceum theatre posters from 1870 to 1900 at National Library of Scotland
  Academic, refereed papers on the Royal Lyceum Theatre Company 1965 to 2000, by Paul Iles

Theatres in Edinburgh
Edinburgh Festival
Category A listed buildings in Edinburgh
Charles J. Phipps buildings
Reportedly haunted locations in Edinburgh
Theatres completed in 1883
Producing theatres in Scotland